Basler is a German fashion brand founded in Berlin, Germany in 1936.

Fritz Basler GmbH & Co. KG was founded by Fritz Basler and his wife Elisabeth, with manufacturing in Kreuzberg, which later relocated to Berlin-Charlottenburg shortly before the end of World War II. In 1959, manufacturing moved to Aschaffenburg, Bavaria. In 1994, Luke Basler took over the business, and later expanded production into Erfurt, Thuringia. Online sales accounted for 81% of total sales in 2012.

In November 2017, German fashion company TriStyle Group acquired Basler and confirmed the closure of the brand's stores.

References

External links

Clothing companies of Germany
Clothing companies established in 1936
German companies established in 1936